Terry Clark Burton (born January 31, 1956) is an American politician. He is a Republican and former Senator, representing District 31. He also served as President Pro Tempore. He was arrested for drunk driving and did not file for reelection to the Senate.

Early life
Terry Clark Burton was born on January 31, 1956, in Philadelphia, Mississippi.

Career
Burton serves as a Republican member of the Mississippi State Senate, representing District 31, which includes parts of Lauderdale County, Newton County, Scott County, Mississippi. Since January 2016, he has also served as President Pro Tempore of the Mississippi Senate. In February 2015, he proposed a bill to lower the concealed carry fees in Mississippi from $100 to $80.

Burton is a York Rite Mason and a Shriner.

On December 19, 2018, Burton was arrested for suspicion of driving under the influence for the third time in less than 5 years. He stated he would remain as the Mississippi State Senate President Pro Tempore. However, he resigned from his role and stated he would retire at the end of the year.

Personal life
Burton is married to Darleen Allday, with whom he has two children. They reside in Newton, Mississippi. He is a member of the United Methodist Church.

References

1956 births
21st-century American politicians
American Freemasons
Living people
Republican Party Mississippi state senators
People from Philadelphia, Mississippi
Presidents pro tempore of the Mississippi State Senate